KAYQ (97.1 FM, "The Lake") is a radio station  broadcasting a Classic Country format. Licensed to Warsaw, Missouri, United States.  The station, established in 1980, is owned by Valkyrie Broadcasting.

References

External links

AYQ
Classic country radio stations in the United States
Radio stations established in 1980